A bad habit is a negative behaviour pattern.

Bad Habit may also refer to:

Albums
 Bad Habit (album) or the title song, by Alee, 2017
 Bad Habit, a 2012 EP by Madilyn Bailey
 Bad Habit, a 2020 EP by Levi Kreis
 Bad Habit, a 2008 EP by Team Robespierre

Songs
 "Bad Habit" (Foals song), 2013
 "Bad Habit" (Steve Lacy song), 2022
 "Bad Habit", by Ben Platt from Sing to Me Instead, 2019
 "Bad Habit", by Better Off, 2018
 "Bad Habit", by Black Stone Cherry from Family Tree, 2018
 "Bad Habit", by Destiny's Child from Destiny Fulfilled, 2004
 "Bad Habit", by Hanna Ferm, 2018
 "Bad Habit", by Imelda May from Life Love Flesh Blood, 2017
 "Bad Habit", by the Buoys, 2021
 "Bad Habit", by the Kooks from Listen, 2014
 "Bad Habit", by the Offspring from Smash, 1994
 "Bad Habit", by Sarah Hudson from Naked Truth, 2004
 "Bad Habit", by the Secret Sisters from Put Your Needle Down, 2014
 "Bad Habit", by Whistle, 1990
 "Bad Habit", by Zia, 2010

Other uses
 Bad Habit, an American rock band featuring John Altenburgh

See also
 
 Bad Habits (disambiguation)
 Habit (disambiguation)